Clube de Desportos do Maxaquene, usually known simply as Maxaquene, is a sports club based in Maputo, Mozambique. The club is nicknamed Maxaca. Currently besides football (soccer) there are two indoor sports namely basketball (CD Maxaquene Basketball) and handball. In such sports Maxaquene is only the club with the most national titles after independence. Maxaquene won its first post-independence title in football, the Taça de Moçambique, in 1978. Prior to Mozambique's independence from Portugal, Maxaquene were known as Sporting Clube de Lourenço Marques or simply Sporting de Lourenço Marques (Lourenço Marques being the name for Maputo before independence). Under this name, the legendary Eusébio played for the club.

Name history
 1920–76: Founded as Sporting Clube de Lourenço Marques.
 1976–78: The club is renamed Sporting Clube de Maputo.
 1978–present: The club is renamed Clube de Desportos Maxaquene. Between December 1981 and February 1982, the club took the name Asas de Moçambique.

Stadium
The club plays their home matches at Estádio do Maxaquene, which has a maximum capacity of 15,000 people.

Achievements
 Campeonato de Moçambique: (5)
1984, 1985, 1986, 2003, 2012
 Taça de Moçambique: (9)
1978, 1982, 1986, 1987, 1994, 1996, 1998, 2001, 2010
 Campeonato Provincial de Moçambique:
1960, 1962
 District Championship of Lourenço Marques: (9)
1922, 1930, 1933, 1938, 1940, 1943, 1948, 1953, 1960
 Taça de Honra de Maputo:
2006

Performance in CAF competitions
CAF Champions League: 1 appearance
2004 – First Round

 African Cup of Champions Clubs: 1 appearance
1987 – Preliminary Round

CAF Confederation Cup: 1 appearance
2011 – Preliminary Round

CAF Cup Winners' Cup: 8 appearances

1979 – First Round
1983 – First Round
1988 – First Round

1991 – First Round
1995 – Semi-finals
1997 – First Round

1999 – Second Round
2002 – First Round

CAF Cup: 2 appearances
1998 – First Round
2003 – First Round

Performance in African competitions
CAF Champions League: 2 appearances
Best: 2003–04 Preliminary Round – Lost against Amazulu 7–4 on aggregate
CAF Confederation Cup: 2 appearances
Best: 2002–03 First Round – Lost against Black Rhinos 1–1 on aggregate
African Cup Winners' Cup: 6 appearances
Best: 1994–95 Semi-finals – Lost against Julius Berger 1–0 on aggregate

Current squad

Former coaches
  Litos (2009)

References

Maxaquene
Association football clubs established in 1978
Sport in Maputo